Ruanda is an administrative ward in the Mbeya Urban district of the Mbeya Region of Tanzania. In 2016 the Tanzania National Bureau of Statistics report there were 24,166 people in the ward, from 21,927 in 2012.

Neighborhoods 
The ward has 11 neighborhoods.

 Benki
 Ilolo
 Kabwe
 Kati
 Makunguru
 Mkombozi
 Mtoni
 Mwenge
 Soko
 Soweto
 Wakulima

References 

Wards of Mbeya Region